Helsinki Swimming Stadium is an outdoor swimming venue in Helsinki, Finland, located in the Eläintarha area to the northeast of the Helsinki Olympic Stadium.

History
The Swimming Stadium was designed by architect Jorma Järvi in the Functionalist style prevalent during the 1930s. The stadium was built for the 1940 Olympic Games which were cancelled due to World War II, but later hosted the 1952 Summer Olympics.

Because of the war, the construction of the Swimming Stadium took a long time, and it was finally completed in 1947. In wartime, the finished pools were used to store herring and root vegetables.

According to the International Swimming Federation, the water temperature in the pool needs to be at least 22 °C, nowadays 27 °C. The machinery to heat the outdoor pool was ordered from abroad, and the ship transporting them was sunk immediately after the war broke out.

The stadium has been listed as a significant example of modern architecture in Finland by Docomomo.

Current use
The Swimming Stadium is a popular recreational venue for citizens. It is open from the beginning of May to the end of September. It is a popular place and in summertime it is visited by about 5,000 swimmers every day – 290,000 altogether in summer 2013. The stadium has three pools: a 50-metre exercise swimming pool, a diving pool and a children's pool, and a small, shallow, round wading pool for small children a little further away. The diving pool has two 1 metre and two 3 metre high springboards, and a 1-metre plateau in front of the diving tower. Use of the diving tower is controlled and requires lifeguard supervision. The 1 and 3 metre springboards are almost always freely usable by customers. However, for example when swimming teams or clubs come to practice at the Stadium, the 3 metre springboard may be reserved for their use.

The area also has a water slide, a gym, a basketball court, a volleyball field, a table tennis table and a café. The gym is open all year round.

Outside normal opening times, the Stadium is used a practicing place for other aquatic sports, for example diving schools use the diving pool as practice place.

The Swimming Stadium was also the scene for filming the popular Finnish youth television show Summeri in 2003–2009 and 2011.

In January 2009, the city of Helsinki initiated a discussion of keeping the Helsinki Swimming Stadium heated throughout the entire autumn and winter, in order to make it accessible for outdoor swimming during the entire year, in honour of the 90th anniversary of the Sports Bureau of Helsinki. However, this idea was abandoned as too expensive.

See also
 Kumpula Outdoor Swimming Pool

References

1952 Summer Olympics official report. pp. 47–9.

External links
The swimming stadium official page

Sports venues in Helsinki
Swimming venues in Finland
Buildings and structures in Helsinki
Venues of the 1952 Summer Olympics
Olympic diving venues
Olympic swimming venues
Olympic water polo venues